The shotted halibut (Eopsetta grigorjewi) is a flatfish of the family Pleuronectidae. It can reach  in length. Its native habitat is the Western Pacific, stretching from the Pacific coast of Japan in the north, through the east coast of Korea, down the coast of China and the Yellow Sea, as far as Taiwan in the south.

References

shotted halibut
Marine fauna of East Asia
Taxa named by Solomon Herzenstein
shotted halibut